Jerry Pettway is a former American basketball player.

Pettway was born in Detroit, Michigan on February 13, 1944. He played college basketball at Northwood Institute from 1963–1967. He is Northwood's all-time leading scorer and rebounder and is a member of that school's Hall of Fame.

Pettway was drafted in the 16th round of the 1967 NBA draft by the Cincinnati Royals but played professional basketball for the other team that drafted him, the Houston Mavericks of the American Basketball Association prior to the ABA–NBA merger.

References

External links
BasketballReference.com Jerry Pettway page

1944 births
Living people
American men's basketball players
Basketball players from Detroit
Cincinnati Royals draft picks
Houston Mavericks draft picks
Houston Mavericks players
Northern High School (Detroit, Michigan) alumni
Northwood Timberwolves men's basketball players